The GT World Challenge Asia (formerly Blancpain GT Series Asia and Blancpain GT World Challenge Asia) is a GT series motor racing competition, promoted by the Stéphane Ratel Organisation and organized by Team Asia One GT Management.

Champions

Drivers

Teams

See also
 GT World Challenge Europe
GT World Challenge Europe Endurance Cup
GT World Challenge Europe Sprint Cup
GT World Challenge America
GT World Challenge Australia

External links

Sports car racing series
Group GT3
GT4 (sports car class)